, also known as Partners by Blood, is a Japanese television drama based on the 2007 novel of the same name by Shusuke Shizukui. The series was broadcast by Fuji Television from 15 April to 24 June 2014.

Plot
Natsuki Sahara (Takeru Satoh) is a rookie detective who was assigned to the Ginza Police Station, where he finds himself partnered with his estranged father Akimura Shimao (Atsuro Watabe). Natsuki is a caring emotional type, who tries to do the right thing, while his father (referred to as Gentle-san because he is always drinking Gentle coffee) is lackadaisical about his job, and largely focused on fashion. The two are generally opposite type of characters, and to heighten the friction, Natsuki holds the fact his father, Akimua abandoned his family (including his sister, Shinobu, played by Suzu Hirose) when they were young against them, they work well together in cases, successfully solving a number co crimes. The team includes judo expert Hitomi Maeda (Shiori Kutsuna), who Natsuki is attracted to, but soon finds out she is in fact attracted to his father, who is oblivious to this.

Maeda is also connected to Akiumura with her father. Her father and Akimura were working together, when he was killed by a mysterious serial killer (Kaizuka Takehisa, played by Oikawa Mitsuhiro), who kills people while listening to opera. The serial killer reappears, and the three try to arrest him.

The three work together in the investigative team at the Ginza police station, with a slightly unusual team, including Hisashi Koga "the Bachelor," Toshifumi Inaki "the Chaser," Kaoru Togashi "the Skunk," Kouji Takano, and their boss, Kensuke Kagiyama.

Cast

Takeru Satoh as Natsuki Sahara
Atsuro Watabe as Akimura Shimao
Shiori Kutsuna  as  Hitomi Maeda
Mitsuru Fukikoshi as Toshifumi Inaki
Tetsushi Tanaka as Hisashi Koga
Sarutoki Minagawa as  Kaoru Togashi
Keiji Kuroki as Kōiji Takano
Katsumi Takahashi as Kensuke Kagiyama
Suzu Hirose as Shinobu Sahara
Reiko Kusamura as Machi Yamamura
Mitsuhiro Oikawa as Takehisa Kaizuka

References

External links
  
 

Japanese drama television series
Fuji TV dramas
2014 Japanese television series debuts
2014 Japanese television series endings
Television shows based on Japanese novels